Kentucky Route 80 (KY 80) is a  state highway in the southern part of the U.S. state of Kentucky. The route originates on the state's western border at Columbus in Hickman County and stretches across the southern portion of the state, terminating southeast of Elkhorn City on the Virginia state line. It is the longest Kentucky State Highway, though the official distance as listed in route logs is much less due to multiple concurrencies with U.S. Route 68 (US 68) and US 23.

The route was split into two segments from 2003 to November 2009. Construction and relocation of KY 80 in Graves, Calloway, and Marshall counties during this time caused the route to be split. A new, four-laned  section of KY 80 opened in Calloway County on November 25, 2009. The route is now four-lanes from Mayfield to Bowling Green after the widening to four lanes from Canton to Cadiz was completed in 2020.

Route description

Jackson Purchase region
From Columbus, the road passes through Hickman, Carlisle, and Graves counties to Mayfield. Before 2003, the road passed through Mayfield and into Marshall County before converging with US 68 in Aurora. The two-lane segment of former KY 80 from Mayfield to Aurora now has two separate designations. From Mayfield to Brewers in Marshall County, the road retains its former co-designation as KY 58. The segment from Brewers to Aurora is now designated as KY 402.

From Mayfield, KY 80 travels along a new four-lane corridor into Calloway County and on to Murray. The route continues through eastern Calloway County and into Marshall County before converging with US 68 near the eastern terminus of KY 402 in Aurora.

Lake Barkley and Kentucky Lake to Somerset
From Aurora, it follows US 68 through Trigg, Christian, Todd, and Logan counties to Bowling Green (Warren County).

From Bowling Green through Glasgow to Edmonton, Kentucky Route 80 remains overlapped with US 68 serving eastern Warren, Barren and Metcalfe Counties until it goes a little past downtown Edmonton. From Glasgow to Somerset, KY 80 is paralleled (and largely supplanted) by the Louie B. Nunn Cumberland Parkway, which is officially designated as the future route of Interstate 66 (I-66), although interest in that project has been lost.

KY 80 serves rural portions of Barren, Metcalfe (including the city of Edmonton), Adair, Russell, and Casey counties to Somerset (Pulaski County).

Somerset to Hazard
Between Somerset and London (Laurel County), KY 80 is again the primary route. The state's I-66 proposals call for KY 80 to again be bypassed in this area, with the new road to share only the crossing over the Rockcastle River gorge. This proposal has met with controversy, with area residents preferring that the new Interstate be built on the existing KY 80 right of way.

From London to Hazard, KY 80 is again supplanted, this time by the former Daniel Boone Parkway, renamed the Hal Rogers Parkway in 2003. KY 80 serves rural portions of Clay, Leslie, and Perry counties before rejoining the Parkway near Hazard.

Hazard to Pikeville and the Virginia border
KY 80 is a modern four-lane highway (though not controlled access) from Hazard through Knott County to Watergap in Floyd County where it converges with US 23.  This section of Kentucky Route 80 was completely new construction, with the old highway's segments renamed with several designations, primarily KY 550. KY 80 continues, concurrent with US 460 until reaching Belcher in Pike County and continues into Virginia from Elkhorn City as Virginia State Route 80.

History

Pre-1960s
KY 80's original western terminus was on the east side of Bowling Green during the 1930s and early 1940s. It was extended to its current length, including the concurrency with US 68, in around the late 1940s or early 1950s.

Originally, KY 80 continued westward via ferry across the Mississippi River to Belmont, Missouri, where it connected with Missouri Route 80, which travels west to US 61/US 62 near Sikeston, Missouri. That ferry has long since been discontinued.

Late 20th century realignments 
KY 80's original alignments in Knott and Perry counties were renumbered to KY 550 at some point around 1979–1980. Several other segments of KY 80 were rerouted in various areas between Somerset and Prestonsburg between 1977 and 1984.

When the US 68/KY 80 four-lane realignment was completed in the late 1990s, several of the route's old alignments were kept intact, notably in areas between Hopkinsville and Bowling Green. Old alignments of US 68/KY 80 in Fairview, Elkton, Russellville, Auburn, Bowling Green and Glasgow were converted into business routes of US 68. Sometime in 2007, the route was rerouted onto a bypass route around Cadiz; the original alignment in that city also became a US 68 business loop.

Rerouting in the Purchase area 
The KY 80 alignment from Brewers to Aurora was renumbered as KY 402 at some point during the 2002/2003 fiscal year. In the late 2000s, KY 80 was re-routed onto a four-lane highway from Mayfield to Aurora via the northern outskirts of Murray. The segment from US 641 to US 68 was completed in 2006, while the remainder was built during the 2008/2009 fiscal year.

Eggners Ferry Bridge collapse of 2012 

On January 26, 2012, the Eggner's Ferry Bridge carrying KY 80 and US 68 over Kentucky Lake (Tennessee River) near Aurora collapsed because a cargo ship crashed into one of the bridge's support pillars. The bridge re-opened to traffic in May 2012, but it was replaced by a four-lane bridge that was built more than three years afterwards. A new bridge with similar design over Lake Barkley was completed in 2018 to replace the old bridge there.

Major intersections

Special routes

Mayfield business route

Kentucky Route 80 Business (KY 80 Bus.) is a business route of KY 80 located in Mayfield, in Graves County. The main alignment of KY 80 has a  gap within the city from the Purchase Parkway (Future Interstate 69) interchange to US 45 in downtown Mayfield. KY 80's main alignment resumes beyond the US 45 junction.

Pulaski County connector route 

Kentucky Route 80 Connector (KY 80 Conn.) is a roadway in Pulaski County that connects KY 80 with KY 3261. It is located on the west side of Somerset just outside of the city limits.

Somerset business route

Kentucky Route 80 Business (KY 80 Bus.) is a business route of KY 80 located in Somerset, the Pulaski County seat. It begins on the west side of Somerset at KY 80's junction with the KY 914 bypass. It intersects US 27 and KY 1247 in downtown. Its eastern terminus after intersecting KY 192 is at mile point 21.161 of the main route of KY 80 on the east side of Somerset.

Floyd County spur route 

Kentucky Route 80 Spur (KY 80S) is a spur route of KY 80 in southern Floyd County. It connects KY 80 with KY 1428 at Martin.

See also

References

External links

KentuckyRoads.com KY 80
KentuckyRoads.com Images along KY 80

 
0080
U.S. Route 68
Transportation in Hickman County, Kentucky
Transportation in Carlisle County, Kentucky
Transportation in Graves County, Kentucky
Transportation in Calloway County, Kentucky
Transportation in Marshall County, Kentucky
Transportation in Trigg County, Kentucky
Transportation in Christian County, Kentucky
Transportation in Todd County, Kentucky
Transportation in Logan County, Kentucky
Transportation in Warren County, Kentucky
Transportation in Barren County, Kentucky
Transportation in Metcalfe County, Kentucky
Transportation in Adair County, Kentucky
Transportation in Russell County, Kentucky
Transportation in Casey County, Kentucky
Transportation in Pulaski County, Kentucky
Transportation in Laurel County, Kentucky
Transportation in Clay County, Kentucky
Transportation in Leslie County, Kentucky
Transportation in Perry County, Kentucky
Transportation in Knott County, Kentucky
Transportation in Floyd County, Kentucky
Transportation in Pike County, Kentucky